Heathcote is an electoral district of the Legislative Assembly in the Australian state of New South Wales. It was established in 1971 abolished in 1991 and re-established in 1999. Since 2011 it is represented by Lee Evans of the Liberal Party.

Members for Heathcote

Election results

References

External links

Heathcote
1971 establishments in Australia
Constituencies established in 1971
1991 disestablishments in Australia
Constituencies disestablished in 1991
1999 establishments in Australia
Constituencies established in 1999